Oostwold is a village in the municipality of Westerkwartier in the province of Groningen in the Netherlands.

History 
The village was first mentioned in 1458 as "jn oestwolde", and means eastern woods.

In 1908, the Dutch Reformed church was built as a replacement of its medieval predecessor. It was decommissioned in 2004, and 2005 bought by the restaurant next door for parties, meeting and congresses.

Oostwold was home to 254 people in 1840.

Gallery

References

External links
 

Westerkwartier (municipality)
Populated places in Groningen (province)